The Majin Bone anime series premiered on April 1, 2014. Episodes are simulcast with English, Spanish, and Portuguese subs on Crunchyroll to people in the United States, Canada, South Africa, Australia, New Zealand, and Latin America (Central & South America including Mexico).

Music
Opening themes
 "Legend is Born" by Kazuki Katou (eps. 1–30) 
 "Sensation Signal" by Glutamine (eps. 31-52)
Ending themes
 "OKAN GOMEN" by Misoshiru's (eps. 1–13)
 "Blue Destiny" by Koyuki Takeno (eps. 14–40)
 "Ripumi" by LUI FRONTiC Akabane JAPAN (eps. 41-52)

Episode list

References 

Majin Bone